The eighth season of Shameless, an American comedy-drama television series based on the British series of the same name by Paul Abbott, was announced on December 19, 2016, a day after the seventh season finale. The season, which premiered on November 5, 2017, consisted of a total of 12 episodes.

This is also the last season to feature Isidora Goreshter as series regular, as she announced her departure from the series following the season finale.

Plot
Fiona begins her new role as landlord of a local apartment building; she gets to know several of the apartment tenants, including Nessa (Jessica Szohr), a lesbian resident, while regularly facing problems within the neighborhood. Nessa introduces Fiona to Ford (Richard Flood), a mysterious Irish carpenter with a colorful past. Fiona bonds with Ford, who helps Fiona deal with a family of apartment squatters trying to sue her. The two eventually begin a sexual relationship. At the end of the season, Fiona confronts Ford about the state of their relationship; Ford reveals that he's happy in their relationship, but that he'll never be "madly in love" with her or anyone.

Ian has begun regularly helping teens at Trevor's youth center, and he and Trevor plan to convert an abandoned church building in Fiona's neighborhood into a homeless shelter. However, Fiona—wanting to raise the profile of the neighborhood—wants to convert the empty church building into an art gallery. The argument over the church building results in an ongoing feud between the two siblings. Fiona ultimately gets one of her connections to lease a new property to Ian and Trevor.

Lip continues to work at Brad's motorcycle shop, though he is forced to find a new sponsor when Brad, stressed from the birth of Cami's new baby, relapses. Lip briefly begins a casual relationship with his female co-worker, Eddie (Levy Tran), but is turned off by her rough nature. Meanwhile, Professor Youens gets charged with his fifth DUI, and he is sentenced to prison after appearing in court under the influence. Youens later dies in prison from a seizure; at the memorial service, Lip is dispirited upon discovering he was not the only student to have had a mentoring relationship with the professor. Sierra has rekindled with Charlie, who reveals to Lip that he had knocked up another girl during his separation with Sierra. Lip urges Charlie to tell Sierra the truth, but this backfires when Sierra angrily dumps Charlie over the secret baby. Initially finding comfort in Lip, Sierra breaks up with him when he encourages her to give Charlie a second chance. 

Following his breakup with Sierra, Lip discovers Eddie's young niece, Xan, sitting alone in the motorcycle shop; Brad reveals that Eddie had abandoned Xan, who is estranged from her parents, at the shop. Upon discovering that Eddie had planned for Xan to be picked up by Social Services, Lip takes in Xan and invites her into the Gallagher home. 

Elsewhere, Frank works towards becoming a reformed man following Monica's death. He successful lands a job at a local store, but quickly regresses to his old ways when the store is shuttered by corporate. Carl begins dating Kassidi (Sammi Hanratty), who suffers from separation anxiety. Kassidi pressures Carl into marrying her, and the two falsify documents at the courthouse to get married; however, Carl breaks up with her when she goes to obsessive measures to prevent him from attending military school. Debbie becomes a welder and reunites with a newly remerged Derek, who wants joint custody of Franny. Kevin and Veronica take back the Alibi from Svetlana, who agrees to partial ownership of the bar. Kevin and Veronica later help Svetlana marry a senile elderly sugar daddy, after which Svetlana moves out of Kevin and Veronica's house. 

As the season progresses, Ian stops taking his medication and starts to spiral; he initiates a protest against a homophobic pastor preaching gay conversion. When the protest goes viral online, Ian gains numerous supporters who agree with his message. Reeling from his newfound popularity, Ian is nicknamed "Gay Jesus" by his followers, while Frank takes advantage of the Gay Jesus movement to make a profit. Near the end of the season, Ian provides sanctuary to a runaway teen whose father is trying to harm him for being gay. Ian gets into a confrontation with the teen's father; the confrontation concludes with Ian, in a grand gesture, exploding the father's vehicle. The incident results in a warrant being placed for Ian's arrest. A concerned Trevor consults with Fiona over the warrant, while Ian begins a protest at a community college. The police quickly arrive to the protest and arrest Ian; the family witnesses Ian's arrest via television.

Cast and characters

Main
 William H. Macy as Frank Gallagher
 Emmy Rossum as Fiona Gallagher
 Jeremy Allen White as Philip "Lip" Gallagher
 Ethan Cutkosky as Carl Gallagher
 Shanola Hampton as Veronica "V" Fisher
 Steve Howey as Kevin "Kev" Ball
 Emma Kenney as Debbie Gallagher
 Cameron Monaghan as Ian Gallagher
 Isidora Goreshter as Svetlana Yevgenivna Milkovich

Special Guest
Dermot Mulroney as Sean Pierce
 Richard Flood as Ford Kellogg

Recurring
 Christian Isaiah as Liam Gallagher
 Jim Hoffmaster as Kermit
 Michael Patrick McGill as Tommy
 Alan Rosenberg as Professor Youens
 Ruby Modine as Sierra Morton
 Zack Pearlman as Neil
 Elliot Fletcher as Trevor
 Juliette Angelo as Geneva
 Alicia Coppola as Sue
 Scott Michael Campbell as Brad
 Levy Tran as Eddie
 Jessica Szohr as Nessa Chabon
 Perry Mattfeld as Mel
David Brackett as Duran
Sharon Lawrence as Margo Mierzejewski
 Faran Tahir as Adeeb
 Raffi Barsoumian as Bahir
 Melissa Paladino as Cami Tamitetti
 Sammi Hanratty as Kassidi Gallagher 
 Chet Hanks as Charlie
 Tina Ivlev as Freelania Alexeyevich
 Scarlet Spencer as Alexandra "Xan" Galvez

Episodes

Ratings

References

External links
 
 

Shameless (American TV series)
2017 American television seasons
2018 American television seasons